Ingmann is a surname. Notable people with the surname include:

Grethe and Jørgen Ingmann, Danish singers and musicians
Grethe Ingmann (1938–1990), Danish singer
Jørgen Ingmann (1925–2015), musician from Copenhagen, Denmark